Johan Mjelde Natvig (20 February 1915 – 4 August 1998) was a Norwegian politician for the Liberal Party.

He served as a deputy representative to the Parliament of Norway from Rogaland during the terms 1965–1969 and 1969–1973. In total he met during 71 days of parliamentary session.

References

1915 births
1998 deaths
Deputy members of the Storting
Liberal Party (Norway) politicians
Rogaland politicians